Nina Power   is an English writer and philosopher. She is a senior editor of and columnist for the online magazine Compact.

Power received her PhD in philosophy from Middlesex University on the topic of humanism and antihumanism in postwar French philosophy, and also has an MA and BA in philosophy from the University of Warwick. She was a senior lecturer in philosophy at Roehampton University, and has taught at Middlesex, Orpington College, London College of Communication, Morley College. Power also worked as a tutor in critical writing in art and design at the Royal College of Art, is a fellow of the Royal Society of Arts and a member of the British Philosophical Association.

She served as both editor and translator (with Alberto Toscano) of Alain Badiou's On Beckett.

Some of the publications she regularly contributes are frieze, Wire, Radical Philosophy, The Guardian, Cabinet, Film Quarterly, Icon and The Philosophers' Magazine.

In 2015, she commissioned Bad Feelings by Arts Against Cuts, a collection of writing and 'set of materials for conflict and commonality' published by Book Works.

Selected bibliography

Translated books

(with Alberto Toscano), Alain Badiou, On Beckett. London: Clinamen Press, 2003.
(with Alberto Toscano) Alain Badiou, Political Writings. New York: Columbia University Press, forthcoming.

Authored books

One-Dimensional Woman (Winchester: Zero Books, 2009).
Translated into French as La Femme Unidimensionnelle by Nicolas Vieillescazes (Paris: Les Prairies Ordinaires, 2010).
Translated into Turkish as "Tek Boyutlu Kadin" by Özlem Kaya (Istanbul: Habitus Kitap, 2010).
Translated into German as "Die eindimensionale Frau" by Anna-Sophie Springer (Berlin: Merve, 2011).
Translated into Italian by Cecilia Savi as "La donna a una dimensione" (Rome: DeriveApprodi, 2011).
Translated into Spanish by Teresa Arijón as "La mujer unidimensional" (Buenos Aires: Cruce Casa Editora, 2016) .
Translated into Korean by SeongJun Kim as "Dodukmajeun Feminism" (Seoul: Editus, 2018).
What Do Men Want? (UK: Penguin, 2021).

Selected articles in edited collections and books

"E.P. Thompson's Concept of Class, the Flesh and Blood of Self-Emancipation", E. P. Thompson and English Radicalism, ed. Roger Fieldhouse & Richard Taylor (Manchester: MUP, 2013)
(with Alberto Toscano), "Politics". Badiou: Key Concepts. Ed. Justin Clemens and A. J. Barlett. (London: Acumen, 2010).
"On Feuerbach, Speculation and Atheism", After the Postsecular and the Postmodern: New Essays in Continental Philosophy of Religion, ed. by Anthony Paul Smith and Daniel Whistler (Cambridge Scholars Press, 2010). 
"Towards a Cybernetic Communism: The Technology of the Anti-Family", Further Adventures of the Dialectic of Sex, ed. by Mandy Merck and Stella Sandford (Palgrave Macmillan, 2010).

Selected articles in journals

"Potentiality or Capacity? Agamben's Missing Subjects", Theory and Event, (13.1, Spring 2010). A version of this essay was published in Slovenian in Filozofski vestnik, Vol. XXX, No. 1, Ljubljana, 2009.
"Non-Reproductive Futurism", Borderlands, vol. 8, no. 2, 2009. 
"Which Anarchism? On the Advantages and Disadvantages of Infinity for (Political) Life: A Response to Simon Critchley's Infinitely Demanding", Critical Horizons, Vol. 10 (2009), Issue 2.. 
"Which Equality? Badiou and Rancière in Light of Ludwig Feuerbach", Parallax (Volume 15, Issue 3 August 2009) (available on academia.edu). 
"The Philosophy of Restoration: Alain Badiou and the Enemies of May" (with Alberto Toscano), (abstract), boundary 2, 2009 36(1) (available on academia.edu)
"The Truth of Humanity: The Collective Political Subject in Sartre and Badiou", Pli: The Warwick Journal of Philosophy, vol. 9, 2009. 
"Axiomatic Equality: Jacques Rancière and the Politics of Contemporary Education", Polygraph, 21 (2009). Reprinted in Eurozine. 
"Philosophy's Subjects", Parrhesia, Issue 3, 2007.
"The Terror of Collectivity: Sartre's Theory of Political Groups", Prelom 8 (Belgrade), Fall 2006.
"Towards an Anthropology of Infinitude: Badiou and the Political Subject", Cosmos and History, 'The Praxis of Alain Badiou', Issue 2, 2006.
"Bachelard contra Bergson and Ancient Atomism", Angelaki, Volume 11, Issue 3 2006 (available on academia.edu).
"Badiou and Feuerbach: What is Generic Humanity?", Subject Matters: A Journal of Communication and the Self, Vol. 2, no. 1, 2005.
Translation (with Alberto Toscano) of Alain Badiou's "Existence and Death",Discourse: Journal for Theoretical Studies in Media and Culture, 24.1 (2002). 
"On the Nature of Things: Nietzsche and Democritus", Pli, 12 (2001).

Film appearances
 Marx Reloaded, ZDF/Arte, April 2011.

References

External links
Power's profile at the Guardian newspaper website
Power's profile at Zero Books
Figure/Ground interview with Nina Power. December 30th, 2012
 Nina Power delivers lecture: Men, women, and the twenty-first century. Filmed at the University of Sheffield 
 Nina Power interview with the Prokhorov Centre: One-dimensional woman
 Nina Power interview with the Prokhorov Centre: Feuerbach, Sartre, and the collective political subject

Living people
British philosophers
Social philosophers
British sociologists
French–English translators
Marxist theorists
Year of birth missing (living people)
Academics of the University of Roehampton
Alumni of Middlesex University